L'Evêque is a mountain of the Pennine Alps, overlooking the Col Collon in the canton of Valais, south of Mont Collon. With a height of 3,716 meters above sea level, it is one of the highest summits in the Arolla valley.

See also
List of mountains of Switzerland

References

External links
 L'Evêque on Hikr

Mountains of the Alps
Alpine three-thousanders
Mountains of Switzerland
Mountains of Valais